Kannur is one of 14 districts along the west coast in the southern state of Kerala, India. It has a population of over 2.4 million people.

There are fifteen blocks within Kannur and all schools are divided into blocks, and then subdivided into clusters. Schools are operated by the government, private trusts, or individuals. Schools are affiliated with either the Indian Certificate of Secondary Education (ICSE), the Central Board for Secondary Education (CBSE), Kerala State Education Board or the National Institute of Open Schooling.

In most private schools, English is the language of instruction. In government run schools, English or Malayalam are offered as the language of instruction.

Kannur Area

 St. Francis School, Thottada
 Municipal High School, Talap
 Sreepuram School, Talap
 S.N.Vidya Mandir, Kannur
 Chinmaya Vidyalaya, Kannur
 Seventh-day Adventist School, Kannur
 Central School, Kannur
 St. Michael's Boys School, Kannur
 St. Teresa's Girls School, Kannur
 Army School, Kannur
 Amrita Vidyalam, Kannur
 GHSS Cherukunnu, Kannur
 RIMS International School, Kannur

Thalassery Area 

 Basel Evangelical Mission Parsi High School
 Sacred Heart Girls' High School
 St Joseph's Higher Secondary School
GVHSS Kadirur

Taliparamba Area
 Central School, Mangattuparamba
 Bharathiya Vidya Bhavan, Taliparamba
 Al Maquar chool, Taliparamba

Payyanur Area
 Navodaya Vidyalaya, Chendayad
 Central School, Payyannur

Iritty Area
 St. Anne's School, Payyavoor
 Alphonsa School, Keezhpally

References

 
Kannur